SC Langnau Tigers are a professional ice hockey team from Langnau im Emmental, Switzerland. They play in the National League (NL). The team plays its home games in the 6,000-seat Ilfis Stadium, which is currently one of the smallest arenas in the NL.

History
Originally formed as the Ice skating club Langnau, the team was founded on 30 January 1946. The 1948–49 season started in the summer due to the planing on the grounds of the Napro, where the ice rink was to be built. The ice rink began operation on 26 December 1948. SC Langnau, who had not yet completed any championship games, secured the "Begert Cup". Nine out of 16 games were won. The game against Rotblau Bern was attended by over 1000 spectators.

SC Langnau participated for the first time within the Swiss Championship, starting in the lowest league stage of the Swiss ice hockey. Opponents in the 1949–50  season were Roggwil, Olten, Münsingen and the second team of Red Blue Bern of the Serie B. In the season 1950–51, SC Langnau took part in the league operation of Serie B, Group 6 Central Switzerland. Langnau was group winner for the first time, but lost in the final against Bern. Langnau won the Cantonal Cup of the Serie B. In that season, the team completed a total of 23 games, including 16 at home.

The SCL Tigers, promoted to the NLA in 1998, are the successor club of the Schlittschuh-Club Langnau (SCL), which was outsourced to SCL Tigers AG in 1999 under the direction of President René Zeh. Zeh became the first chairman of the board. The club's club logo comes from the long-standing main sponsor, the long-established traditional company "Tiger Käse AG" (since 2004 " Emmi Fondue AG"), which has been sponsoring the club with its "Tiger" brand since the 1970s.

In October 2001, businessman Ruedi Soltermann took over Zeh's Presidency to lead SCL. In the summer of 2002, the club confirmed to have a debt amount of more than one million francs with the financial difficulties plaguing the club in the following years.

At the beginning of February 2005, Armin Müller was removed from the Board of Directors. According to the SCL, Müller, who was responsible for sponsorship, promised advertising revenues of nearly 1.3 million francs for the 2004–05 season, of which only a fraction arrived. The SCL Tigers announced that they would file charges for document forgery and misleading management. With SCL's long standing economical trouble's, an initiative "Save the Tigers" was founded in July 2009 with entrepreneur, Peter Jakob. In September 2009, Jakob became the President to the board of directors of SCL Tigers AG,
and over the following years added financial stability to the Tigers and erasing their debts.

After their initial promotion in 1998, they played in Switzerland's top hockey level for 15 years. At the end of the 2012–2013 NLA season, they were defeated in the promotion/relegation games by Lausanne HC and were relegated to the National League B. SCL Tigers became the champions of the 2014–15 NLB season and gained the right to play against the worst team of 2014–15 NLA season in the promotion/relegation round. They will return to National League A for the 2015–2016 season after they defeated the Rapperswil-Jona Lakers in four games. Langnau was the eighth most attended team in the NLA for the 2015–16 season, averaging 5,868 (98%).

Honors

Champions
NL Championship (1): 1976
SL Championship (5): 1934, 1989, 1957, 1999, 2015

Runners-up
NL Championship (3): 1970, 1977, 1978

Players

Current roster

Honored members

References

External links
 SCL Tigers official website

Ice hockey teams in Switzerland